Kirby White is an Australian physician who is a general practitioner in Bendigo and inventor. She was named Victoria's "Local Hero" and nominee for the 2021 Australian of the Year awards. Mattel created a 'Dr Kirby White' Barbie doll to honour her efforts during the COVID-19 pandemic.

Early life and education 
White attended Deakin University, where she graduated with a degree in biological sciences in 2005. She moved to the University of Melbourne for graduate studies. After graduating she worked as a medical scientist in Melbourne. She eventually returned to academia, working toward a Bachelor of Medicine, Bachelor of Surgery at the University of Notre Dame Australia.

Career 
White works as a general practitioner in Bendigo. In the early days of the COVID-19 pandemic in Australia, White realised that they would run out of disposable gowns by the third week. She launched Gowns for Doctors, an initiative that received over $40,000 in crowd funding to create re-usable, launderable hospital gowns. Kirby then worked with commercial textile companies and volunteers to create thousands of gowns.

White was nominated as Victoria's "Local hero" at the Australian of the Year awards for her efforts in creating washable, re-usable gowns for doctors treating patients with COVID-19.

In August 2021, Barbie announced that they were creating a White Barbie doll honouring her efforts to protect frontline staff during the COVID-19 pandemic.

Personal life 
White has two children and enjoys classic vintage cars.

References 

Australian general practitioners
Living people
Year of birth missing (living people)
People from Bendigo
Deakin University alumni
University of Melbourne alumni
University of Notre Dame Australia alumni
Australian medical doctors